Francisco Pérez de Valenzuela (14 November 1528 in Andújar, Spain – 27 December 1599 in Valdivia, Chile), was a nobleman of the Kingdom of Spain. He traveled to the Americas, where was appointed as military and navy leader by the Spanish Crown in the Viceroyalty of Peru, being captain in some battles. During his last days he was a Royalist politician nominated and elected Corregidor so called City Mayor in Valdivia, city-port founded by his countryman named Peter of Valdivia (Pedro de Valdivia) conqueror of Chile. There he did a good job making strategies protecting southern cities, forts and ports, and avoiding attacks by pirates. He also was a businessman like his father named Alonso Pérez de Valenzuela y de la Cava.

External links
 https://web.archive.org/web/20100124174229/http://www.cec.uchile.cl/~mpilleux/genealogia/ApellidosFamiliasFundadoras.html Familias Fundadoras de Chile 1540–1600 de Julio Retamal Favereau, Carlos Celis Atria y Juan Guillermo Muñoz Correa (Editorial Universitaria, 1992)
 https://web.archive.org/web/20100412114432/http://www.chilecollector.com/archwebhist2/archwebprefilatelia/gobernadores_chiloe01.html Gobernadores de Chiloé 1567–1874
División Política Administrativa Colonial de Chile
 http://www.cervantesvirtual.com/servlet/SirveObras/12593842001258285209068/index.htm Cartas de Pedro de Valdivia que tratan del descubrimiento y conquista del Reino de Chile
 http://www.tpino.netfirms.com/Valenzue.htm Consultadas, Familias Chilenas, de Tomás Pino Aldunate""
 https://web.archive.org/web/20110425033100/http://www.chilecollector.com/archwebhist2/archwebprefilatelia/gobernadores_valdivia01.html Gobernadores de Valdivia desde 1540 hasta el año 1900
 http://dialnet.unirioja.es/servlet/fichero_articulo?codigo=1198058&orden=68018 Expediente de Nobleza del Linaje Valenzuela desde Jaén-España hasta Chile. ENGLISH
 http://www.genealog.cl/Chile/V.html#PerezdeValenzuelaArandaValdivia,Pedro ""Genealogía de Chile o de la gran Familia Chilena
 :es:Marchihue#Or.C3.ADgenes Viñedos y tierras de la Familia Valenzuela en el Valle de Colchagua
 http://www.tpino.netfirms.com/Valenzu2.htm De acuerdo a don Luis de Roa y Urzúa (El Reyno de Chile. 1535–1810. Talleres Tipográficos Cuesta. Valladolid)
 http://tpino.netfirms.com/Valenzu2.htm Extraido desde Genealógicos Pino y Cía. Ltda." (Genea Ltda.)
 http://www.wikilosrios.cl/index.php/Isla_Teja´ Información acerca de Isla Teja ubicada en la Ciudad de Valdivia, Chile
 http://diario.elmercurio.cl/detalle/index.asp?id={04c371e5-3ea3-4531-82d4-1805aeba340b}
 http://www.valdiviachile.com/ciudad/descubre-valdivia/historia-valdivia.htm
 http://diario.elmercurio.cl/detalle/index.asp?id={2452062a-c84a-433b-8bfa-2fd0919a96bb}
 http://dialnet.unirioja.es/servlet/articulo?codigo=2141741 Hechos narrados de acontecimientos extraídos desde el libro "Pérez de Valenzuela, Un Linaje Giennense en la conquista y poblamiento del nuevo mundo" de Don Régulo Valenzuela Matte.

1528 births
1599 deaths
Spanish untitled nobility
Spanish viceroys